Com2uS Studios (Hangul:컴투스) (formerly Com2uS) is a South Korean mobile and online game development/publishing company established in 1998. Com2uS develops games for Android, iOS, and other platforms. The company's corporate offices are located in the United States, Korea, Japan, and China.

In 2007, Com2uS was listed on KOSDAQ. On October 4, 2013, Gamevil acquired a majority stake in Com2uS for a little over $65 million.

Com2us launched Summoners War in 2014 and subsequently went on to earn more than $1 billion in revenue from the game in over three years. The results sky-rocketed the stock price of the company to over 1.3 trillion won as of April 2019.

History
Com2uS Corporation was founded in 1998 by Korea University students Jiyoung Park, Youngil Lee, and Yu Jin (Gin) Hyeon, who developed games for mobile devices.

On September 10, 2008, the mobile game division of Disney (Disney Interactive) made a deal with Com2uS in which the latter would develop games for the former to publish and distribute in the United States. Disney Puzzle Family was the first game developed under the agreement, which was released later that month. The next title with Disney Interactive, Disney Game Parade, was released the following year.

In 2008, Com2uS registered a trademark for the term "Tower Defense". Many developers who make tower defense games have changed their games because of this, including Ninja Kiwi's games in the Bloons Tower Defense series. During early 2010, some developers in Apple's App Store affected by this change had reported receiving messages asking them to change names of games, citing trademark violation.

On October 4, 2013, Gamevil acquired 21.37% of Com2us for $65 million.

In January 2020, Com2uS teamed up with Skybound Entertainment, a U.S. entertainment company, to create a mobile game based on The Walking Dead series.

On November 30, 2021, Gamevil changed its corporate name to ‘Com2uS Holdings’ after 21 years in order to strengthen its holding role and increase cooperation with other affiliates in hopes of increasing its reach at a time of rapid global expansion.

Studios

Games

Summoners War
 Summoners War: Lost Centuria
 Summoners War: Sky Arena
 Summoners War: Chronicles

Other
 9 Innings: Pro Baseball
 Ace Fishing: Paradise Blue
 Caligo Chaser
 Chocolate Tycoon
 Chronicles of Inotia 2: Wanderer of Luone
 Chronicles of Inotia 3: Children of Carnia
 Chronicles of Inotia 4: Assassin of Berkel
 Chronicles of Inotia: Legend of Feanor
 Crazy Hotdogs
 Dead City
 Dragon Sky
 East Legend
 Escape the Ape
 Gold Jumper
 Golfstar
 GrandPar Golf
 Heavy Gunner 3D
 Home Run Battle 2
 Home Run Battle 3D
 IMO: The World Of Magic
 Inotia
 Magic Tree by Com2uS (Social Network Game on iOS and Android)
 Mini Game Paradise
 Piggy Adventure
 Puzzle Family
 Queen's Crown
 Skylanders Ring of Heroes!
 Slice It!
 Sniper Vs Sniper: Online
 Soccer Spirits
 SummitX Snowboarding
 Super Action Hero
 Third Blade
 Tiny Farm by Com2uS (Award at Korean Game Conference 2012, 13 million players in 2013)
 Tower Defense: Lost Earth
 Witch Wars
 World of Tunes
 Zombie Runaway
 MLB9Innings21

Discontinued
 Kung Fu Pets

 Arel Wars

 Arel Wars 2

 Zenonia 1,2 & 3

References

External links
 Official website
Facebook Page
LinkedIn Page
Twitter Page
Why did Gamevil acquire Com2us

Mobile game companies
Video game companies of South Korea
Video game companies established in 1998
South Korean companies established in 1998
Video game development companies
2013 mergers and acquisitions